Santa Isabel Biological Reserve is a biological reserve on the coast of the municipalities of Pacatuba and Pirambu in Sergipe, Brazil.

Location

It is administered by the Chico Mendes Institute for Biodiversity Conservation.
It lies in the municipalities of Pacatuba and Pirambu in Sergipe state.
The reserve is mainly a sandbank, with remnants of Atlantic Forest in its interior.
There are some grasses, coconut trees, shrubs, lagoons and mangroves.
Migratory birds include the common tern (Sterna hirundo).
Tropical mockingbird (mimus gilvus) and pectoral antwren (herpsilochmus pectoralis) are endemic.

Conservation

The Biological Reserve is a "strict nature reserve" under IUCN protected area category Ia.
The purpose is to protect the biota without direct human interference other than actions needed to restore and preserve the natural balance, biological diversity and natural ecological processes.
The critically endangered hawksbill sea turtle (eretmochelys imbricata) is protected in the reserve.

References

Sources

Biological reserves of Brazil
Protected areas of Sergipe
Protected areas established in 1988
1988 establishments in Brazil